Will Rogers Memorial Hospital is a historic tuberculosis sanatorium located at Saranac Lake in Essex County, New York.  It was built in 1928 as the National Vaudeville lodge by the National Vaudeville Artists Association, who previously sent patients to the Kennedy Cottage.  It is a three-story, "T" shaped, steel frame and reinforced concrete structure above a raised basement.  It is faced in stucco and decorative half-timber framing in the Tudor Revival style. It features asymmetrical massing, a three-story polygonal tower with a hexagonal roof, and three story pavilions with recessed sleeping porches.  It was named in honor of entertainer Will Rogers (1879-1935) in 1936 and provided unconventional tubercular treatment to entertainment industry patients from 1936 to 1975.  It also was open as a night club but when casinos were voted down in New York, it was closed.  Then it was open as an apartment house.  It stood abandoned for years slowly deteriorating.  It was briefly used as press headquarters for the 1980 Winter Olympics. Finally it was bought and after a huge renovation was done both to the outside and inside, it currently houses an independent living facility known as Saranac Village at Will Rogers.

It was listed on the National Register of Historic Places in 1983.

References

External links

Independent Living Saranac Lake - Saranac Village at Will Rogers website

Hospital buildings on the National Register of Historic Places in New York (state)
Tudor Revival architecture in New York (state)
Buildings and structures completed in 1928
Buildings and structures in Essex County, New York
National Register of Historic Places in Essex County, New York
Saranac Lake, New York